"Hey Eugene!" is a song performed by the band Pink Martini on their third full-length album Hey Eugene! released in 2007. The song was written by China Forbes and peaked at #53 in Switzerland in 2007.

The song was inspired by a boy China Forbes met at a party, who asked for her number and then never called...

See also
 Hey Eugene! (album)

References

External links
 Hey Eugene! (album and song)

2007 singles
2007 songs
Songs written by China Forbes